The Centre for High Energy Physics (CHEP) is a federally funded national research institute and a national laboratory site managed by the University of Punjab for the Ministry of Energy (MoE) of the Federal government of Pakistan. CHEP is dedicated towards the scientific advancement and understanding of high energy physics (or particle physics)—a branch of fundamental physics that is concerned with unraveling the ultimate constituents of matter and with elucidating the forces between them.

The site was established in 1982 with efforts by Punjab University with federal funding to support research activities in quantum sciences that started in 1968, and later engaged in the supercomputing that started in 2004.

Overview

The Centre for High Energy Physics (CHEP) was established by the eminent researcher, Dr. Mohammad Saleem, from the federal funding in November 1982. The University of Punjab in Lahore had been engaged in research output in physics in 1968 but the scope was limited to its physics department. CHEP's initial focused was focused and directed towards the advancement of particle physics but began conducting research on supercomputing when it started its teaching program in computational physics in 2004.

CHEP takes participation in Beijing Spectrometer-III (BSE-III) in China and currently hosts a 2.5 GeV linear particle accelerator.

Logo, building and research output

The CHEP's official logo shows a book as a sign of knowledge, and an Arabic verse from the Holy Qur'ann which translates to: "Why don't you think?". On the top of the logo is the CHEP's spelled name and at the bottom is the name of the Punjab University.

The CHEP is located in the campus jurisdiction of the University of Punjab, and has a two-storey building with its own library (other than the university main library), seven computer labs: a programming, modeling, and simulation lab, a supercomputer lab. CHEP certifies Punjab University's degree criteria for bachelor, master's, and doctoral programs in computational sciences while master's and doctoral programs in high-energy physics. In 2015, CHEP supported the publication of a textbook on high-energy physics authored by Mohammad Saleem and Dr. Muhammad Rafique.

The CHEP also has an international collaboration with Michoacan University in Mexico, University of Pittsburgh and Texas Tech University in the United States, Hamburg University in Germany, and Teikyo University in Japan.

See also
University of the Punjab
Ministry of Energy

References

External links
CHEP
Punjab University
Facebook page

Educational institutions established in 1982
Academic institutions in Pakistan
Universities and colleges in Lahore
Physics institutes
Particle physics facilities
Supercomputing in Pakistan
Research institutes in Pakistan
Physics laboratories
Science and technology in Pakistan
Constituent institutions of Pakistan Atomic Energy Commission
University of the Punjab
Laboratories in Pakistan
Computational particle physics